The Ice Palace (Russian: Ледовый Дворец, Ledovy Dvorets) is an arena in Saint Petersburg, Russia. It was built for the 2000 IIHF World Championship and opened in 2000. It holds 12,300 people.

The Ice Palace is primarily used for ice hockey and is the home arena for SKA Saint Petersburg. It hosted the IIHF European Champions Cup in 2005, 2006, 2007 and 2008. It is also used for concerts, exhibitions and as a skating rink.

Events

Many popular musical acts have played the arena, including A-ha, Lana Del Rey, Christina Aguilera, Kylie Minogue, Roxette, Whitney Houston, Mariah Carey, Elton John, Eric Clapton, Sting, Cher, Iron Maiden, Fall Out Boy, Enrique Iglesias, Britney Spears, Jennifer Lopez, Pink, Sade, Björk, Billie Eilish, Robbie Williams, Lorde, Backstreet Boys, Sarah Brightman, NCT 127, Pet Shop Boys, Scorpions, Kiss, Whitesnake and Nickelback.

See also
 List of indoor arenas in Russia
 List of European ice hockey arenas

References

External links

Ice Palace at Hockeyarenas.net
Ice Palace at worldstadiums.com 
Official website (in Russian)

Indoor arenas in Russia
Music venues in Russia
Indoor ice hockey venues in Russia
SKA Saint Petersburg
Kontinental Hockey League venues
Sports venues completed in 2000
2000 establishments in Russia
Sports venues in Saint Petersburg